Sugar Tree is an unincorporated community in Decatur County, Tennessee, United States. The zipcode is: 38380.

Notes

Unincorporated communities in Decatur County, Tennessee
Unincorporated communities in Tennessee